The GeGeGe no Kitarō anime, based on the manga series of the same name by Shigeru Mizuki, was produced by Toei Animation and aired on Fuji TV.

Series overview 
Since the premiere of the first animated adaptation in 1968, a new anime series has been produced in each decade, with 6 adaptations so far.

In 2008, while the 5th anime series was still being aired, a new anime based on the original "Hakaba Kitarō" manga stories was aired. It ran for 11 episodes from January 10 to March 20. According to Toei Animation, this adaptation is not considered part of "GeGeGe no Kitaro" franchise.

GeGeGe no Kitarō series

Hakaba Kitarō

Episodes

1968

1971

1985

1996

2007

Hakaba Kitarō (2008)

2018

Notes

References

External links

Gegege no Kitaro
Episodes